is a Japanese manga  series written and illustrated by Osamu Ishiwata. The manga ran in Shogakukan's shōnen manga magazine Weekly Shōnen Sunday from 1985 issue 24 to 1991 issue 9. The title stands for "Burning Blood" and Ishiwata's subsequent serial LOVe was a continuation of this series. In 1989, B.B. won the Shogakukan Manga Award in the shōnen category.

Plot
One night after leaving a club where he was playing trumpet Ryō Takagi is jumped by a motorcycle gang. The scuffle spills out into the streets and causes a traffic accident. Ryō eventually gives up his musical career and joins the world of underground boxing as he struggles to overcome his "burning blood" and the anger that easily overtakes him.

Characters

Ryo Takagi - Kazuhiko Inoue
Jin Moriyama - Show Hayami
Minoru "Sorry" Satou - Toshihiko Seki
Koyuki Matsuhara - Noriko Hidaka
Kouichi Wakabayashi - Hideyuki Hori
Su-chan - Yūko Mizutani
Makoto "Ottosei" Otobe - Tesshō Genda
Gentarou Takagi - Masaru Ikeda
Fox Fire Head - Akio Ōtsuka

Game
It was adapted into a pachinko game by okamura under the title cr B.B. It was released on 1 April 2000.

References

External links
 B.B. at Websunday.net 
 

1985 manga
1990 anime OVAs
Action anime and manga
Boxing in anime and manga
Magic Bus (studio)
Shogakukan manga
Shōnen manga
Winners of the Shogakukan Manga Award for shōnen manga